There have been several political parties named the Workers League:

 Workers League (Ireland), sister organisation of the Workers' Revolutionary Party (UK)
 Workers League (Lebanon) (Toilers League)
 Workers League (UK), a split from the International Socialists (UK)
 Workers League (US), now known as the Socialist Equality Party

Political party disambiguation pages